Teardrop Lounge is a cocktail bar in Portland, Oregon's Pearl District, in the United States. Daniel Shoemaker opened the bar in 2007.

Thrillist contributor Pete Dombrosky called the lounge "quiet and inventive". He wrote, "The impressive drink menu, paired with a number of upped/casual appetizers, are the makings of a great night out. The atmosphere is a mix of night club and chic, so anyone will feel comfortable sipping drinks at one of Portland's first cocktail bars."

Kara Stokes and Maya MacEvoy included Cooperativa in Eater Portland 2022 overview of "Where to Eat and Drink in Portland’s Pearl District".

References

External links

 
 
 

2007 establishments in Oregon
Drinking establishments in Oregon
Pearl District, Portland, Oregon
Restaurants in Portland, Oregon